William Frederick Brawn (1 August 1878 – 18 August 1932) was an English international footballer, who played as an outside right in the Football League, most notably for Aston Villa and Chelsea. He was nicknamed "Gansey".

Playing career
Born in Wellingborough, Brawn began his career as an amateur with local non-League clubs Wellingborough St Mark's, Wellingborough Town and Northampton Town. He turned professional when he joined First Division club Sheffield United in January 1900 for a £125 fee. He moved to Aston Villa in December 1901, with whom he won two England caps in 1904 and the 1904–05 FA Cup. Brawn later played league football for Middlesbrough and Chelsea and ended his career with Southern League club Brentford. The final appearance of Brawn's career came in the colours of Tottenham Hotspur, when the White Hart Lane club turned up a man short for a London Combination fixture versus Brentford at Griffin Park on 8 November 1918.

Administrative career 
Brawn served on the Brentford board of directors in 1919 and acted as "advisory manager" from 1919 until 1921.

Personal life 
Brawn married Ada in Wellingborough in 1902. While with Brentford, Billy Brawn ran the Kings Arms Hotel at 19 Boston Road, Brentford and lived there until his death in 1932.

Honours 
Aston Villa
 FA Cup: 1904–05

England
 British Home Championship: 1903–04

Career statistics

References

External links 

1878 births
1932 deaths
English footballers
England international footballers
Aston Villa F.C. players
English Football League players
Wellingborough Town F.C. players
Northampton Town F.C. players
Sheffield United F.C. players
Middlesbrough F.C. players
Chelsea F.C. players
Brentford F.C. players
Brentford F.C. directors and chairmen
Tottenham Hotspur F.C. players
Southern Football League players
Association football outside forwards
People from Wellingborough
Brentford F.C. non-playing staff
Brentford F.C. wartime guest players
FA Cup Final players